The Boston Convention and Exhibition Center (BCEC) is an exhibition center in Boston, Massachusetts, United States. It is among the largest exhibition centers in the Northeastern United States, with approximately 516,000 square feet (about 4.8 hectares) of contiguous exhibition space. The main exhibition floor comprises three bays which can be isolated for separate shows or linked into one large space.

The center is located on Summer Street near the South Boston waterfront, Boston's World Trade Center, and across the harbor from Logan International Airport. It is about one block south of the World Trade Center station on the MBTA Silver Line, with direct connections to South Station and Logan Airport.

History

In 1997, the owner of the National Football League's New England Patriots—Robert Kraft—and Massport tried unsuccessfully to turn the same parcel of land that the convention center is on into the South Boston Sports Megaplex, with a new home stadium for the football team. They were unable to get the surrounding neighborhoods to agree with the deal because of concerns about traffic.

The push for a new convention center in Boston came in the late 1990s when the semi-annual Macworld trade show, previously held in Boston each summer, moved to the Jacob Javits Convention Center in New York City. It was believed that this move was in part because no single Boston venue could contain the entire show. The center has been controversial because it is located in the South Boston Seaport, which is some distance from the main concentration of hotels in Boston. However several new hotels have been planned or built near the convention center. The Massachusetts State Legislature authorized the BCEC under chapter 152 of the Acts of 1997, which also provided for redevelopment of the Springfield Massachusetts Convention Center in Springfield, MA among other actions designed to balance the impact across the state. A subsequent conflict with local politicians resulted in a change of the name of the area to the South Boston Waterfront. The Project was a joint venture of the Boston Redevelopment Authority and the Massachusetts Convention Center Authority, who employed Tishman Construction as its owner's representative on the project. The new convention center was designed by Rafael Viñoly Architects, New York City, in association with The HNTB Companies, Boston. It opened in June, 2004.

That summer, Macworld returned to Boston as the BCEC's first trade show, but the show's reduced size, due in part to lack of participation by Apple, relegated its 2005 meeting (its last) to the smaller Hynes Convention Center in Boston's Back Bay.

The Westin Boston Waterfront hotel opened next door the BCEC in June 2006. In 2007, the convention center saw over 1.6 million attendees booking over 1 million hotel roomnights. This equates to an economic impact of over $890 million, according to the Massachusetts Convention Center Authority's 2007 Annual Report.

The New England Auto Show, long a staple for the Bayside Expo Center in the Dorchester section of Boston, moved to the new BCEC and signed on through 2009. This show is expected to bring in 90,000 attendees to the convention center. Also in 2007, the BCEC was honored with the 2007 Convention Center of the Year at the Event Solutions Spotlight Awards. Other big shows in 2007 were AIIM/On Demand, the Yankee Dental Congress, and eBay! Live. MCCA proposed expansion in 2007.

In 2009, the Massachusetts Convention Center Authority launched the "Top 5 Campaign", aiming to make Boston one of the top five cities in North America for conventions.  The initiative recommended increasing the number of local hotel rooms. PAX moved its eastern show to the convention hall in 2010.

In 2011, the Authority sought approval for a $2 billion expansion.  In 2012, the large Biotechnology Industry Organization conference said it would not return as scheduled in 2018 without more capacity.

In the 2010s, a new Indigo Line was proposed under the administration of governor Deval Patrick, using diesel multiple units, potentially to connect the BCEC to Back Bay and the many hotels there. Funding for DMUs was cut by the administration of Charlie Baker, and Track 61 was instead converted to test newly manufactured trains for the MBTA Red Line.

In April 2020, the Convention center was set up as a 1,000 bed alternate care site for COVID-19 patients, as part of the government response to the COVID-19 pandemic in Boston, which had also eliminated demand for conferences.

In 2022, governor Charlie Baker proposed selling the Hynes Convention Center and investing the proceeds in the BCEC.

Gallery

See also 
 List of convention centers in the United States

References

External links

 Massachusetts Convention Center Authority
  Boston Convention and Exhibition Center website

2004 establishments in Massachusetts
Buildings and structures completed in 2004
Buildings and structures in Boston
Convention centers in Massachusetts
Economy of Boston
Rafael Viñoly buildings
Seaport District
Tourist attractions in Boston